Cool frénésie (lit: Cool Frenzy) is the fifth studio album by French duo Les Rita Mitsouko.

Track listing

External links
Cool Frénésie release history

References

2000 albums
Virgin Records albums
Les Rita Mitsouko albums